Ante Kovacevic (born 13 June 1974 in Melbourne, Victoria, Australia) is an Australian retired professional football (soccer) player who was the Director of Football at Adelaide United FC.

Biography
Ante Kovacevic started off his senior career at St Albans Dinamo in '92, the club at which he played as a junior for some time. He spent two years in the senior team at Dinamo, making 41 appearances before moving to Dinamo's sister club Melbourne Knights in '94. At the Knights, Ante won back to back NSL titles in '95 and '96, the NSL cup in '95 and the Dockerty Cup in '96 over the six years that he spent there. Kovacevic had a short spell at Green Gully Cavaliers in '98.

Ante made his first interstate move in 2000, when he moved to NSL club Adelaide City FC. He spent three years there and had a short spell at Croatian backed club Adelaide Raiders in the meantime, making six appearances for the club in 2001.

Kovacevic then returned to Melbourne in 2003 to play for South Melbourne FC. The next year, Ante made his first overseas move as he left for Selangor FA, a side in the Malaysia Super League. He spent just the one year with the Malaysians before returning to play football in Australia.

In 2005, he signed a two-year contract with A-League side Perth Glory FC.

References

1974 births
Living people
Australian people of Croatian descent
Soccer players from Melbourne
Expatriate footballers in Malaysia
A-League Men players
National Soccer League (Australia) players
Adelaide City FC players
Melbourne Knights FC players
Perth Glory FC players
South Melbourne FC players
Floreat Athena FC players
Selangor FA players
Association football defenders
Australian soccer players
Australian expatriate sportspeople in Malaysia
Australian expatriate soccer players